During the 1988–89 English football season, Millwall F.C. competed in the Football League First Division. This was Millwall's 62nd season in the Football League, and first ever season in the top tier of English football, after achieving promotion from the Second Division as Champions in 1987–88.

Season summary
Millwall had won promotion to the First Division for the first time in their history as Second Division champions at the end of the 1987–88 season, and were among the pre-season favourites for relegation, but defied the odds and were top of the First Division by the beginning of October, having won four of their first six league games. By Christmas, they were still an impressive fifth in the league, but finished 10th at the end of the season after failing to win any of their final 10 games. Perhaps the only low point of the season was being defeated by arch-rivals West Ham United twice during the season, although Millwall still outperformed their local rivals for the first time in decades, as the Hammers were relegated in 19th place.

Millwall finished one place above Manchester United, one of the pre-season title favourites, and spent much of the season in a higher position than other teams who failed to emerge as title contenders after being among the pre-season favourites, including Everton and Tottenham Hotspur – who both eventually finished slightly above Millwall.

Millwall's high placing owed much to the strike partnership of Teddy Sheringham and Tony Cascarino.

In his autobiography, Sheringham said of the season, "It was a crazy exhilarating time. There we were, little Millwall, in our first season in the First Division and topping the table until about March. Everybody said it couldn't last and of course it couldn't and it didn't, but we gave them all a good run for their money. We were beating the best teams when we shouldn't and getting away draws to which we had no right."

Squad

League table

Transfers

In

Out

Results

First Division

August
 27 August: Aston Villa 2–2 Millwall

September
 3 September: Millwall 1–0 Derby County
 10 September: Charlton Athletic 0–3 Millwall
 17 September: Millwall 2–1 Everton
 24 September: Norwich City 2–2 Millwall

October
 1 October: Millwall 3–2 QPR
 15 October: Coventry City 0–0 Millwall
 22 October: Millwall 2–2 Nottingham Forest
 29 October: Middlesbrough 4–2 Millwall

November
 5 November: Millwall 3–1 Luton Town
 12 November: Liverpool 1–1 Millwall
 19 November: Millwall 4–0 Newcastle United
 26 November: Southampton 2–2 Millwall

December
 3 December: Millwall 0–1 West Ham United
 10 December: Tottenham Hotspur 2–0 Millwall
 17 December: Millwall 1–0 Sheffield Wednesday
 26 December: Wimbledon 1–0 Millwall
 31 December: Derby County 0–1 Millwall

January
 2 January: Millwall 1–0 Charlton Athletic
 14 January: Manchester United 3–0 Millwall
 22 January: Millwall 2–3 Norwich City

February
 4 February: QPR 1–2 Millwall
 11 February: Millwall 1–2 Arsenal
 21 February: Millwall 2–0 Middlesbrough
 25 February: Millwall 1–0 Coventry City
 28 February: Arsenal 0–0 Millwall

March
 11 March: Luton Town 1–2 Millwall
 18 March: Millwall 2–0 Aston Villa
 25 March: Everton 1–1 Millwall
 27 March: Millwall 0–1 Wimbledon

April
 1 April: Sheffield Wednesday 3–0 Millwall
 8 April: Millwall 0–0 Manchester United
 11 April: Millwall 1–2 Liverpool
 22 April: West Ham United 3–0 Millwall
 29 April: Millwall 0–5 Tottenham Hotspur

May
 3 May: Nottingham Forest 4–1 Millwall
 6 May: Newcastle United 1–1 Millwall
 13 May: Millwall 1–1 Southampton

FA Cup

January
 7 January: Millwall 3–2 Luton Town
 29 January: Millwall 0–2 Liverpool

League Cup

September
 27 September: Millwall 3–0 Gillingham

October
 11 October: Gillingham 1–3 Millwall

November
 2 November: Aston Villa 3–1 Millwall

Simod Cup

 9 November: Millwall 1–1 BarnsleyAET (Millwall won 3–0 on penalties)
 29 November: Millwall 2–0 Leeds United
 20 December: Everton 2–0 Millwall

References

1988-89
Millwall